Growth of the Soil is a Norwegian silent film from 1921 based on Knut Hamsun's novel Growth of the Soil. The Danish filmmaker Gunnar Sommerfeldt wrote the screenplay and directed the film, and he also played the role of the bailiff Geissler in the film. Sommerfeldt invested DKK 240,00 in the film, which was a considerable sum in 1921.

Story
The film opens with images from a forest under a glacier, where Isak Sellanrå is clearing the land. Eventually, however, the perspective begins to change, and smaller stories break in and toward the story of Isak and Inger. A modern society is emerging around the two. The story of young Barbro walking into the river with her child, but still ending with Aksel, also receives significant attention.

Filming
The filming took place in the Rana district and was a very big event. A number of locals were used as extras and for minor roles. Isaac's clearing was filmed in Røvassdalen, and other parts were filmed at Tverånes in Mo i Rana, and Hemnesberget and Korgen. A couple of Sami were also hired from the neighboring Swedish municipality of Tärna.

Rediscovery
For many years, the film was presumed lost. It then reappeared in several places. An American professor owned shortened edition, and it is believed that this 60-minute film was the version that was screened in the United States in 1928. A longer version surfaced in the Netherlands. These two copies were combined to create the version that was screened in 2009 during Hamsun Days.

Cast
Amund Rydland: Isak
Karen Poulsen: Inger (credited as Karen Thalbitzer)
Ragna Wettergreen: Oline
Gunnar Sommerfeldt: Geissler, the bailiff
Inge Sommerfeldt: Barbro
Almar Bjørnefjell: Elesius, a young farmer
Sigurd Berg Bruland: Brede Olsen, a farmboy
Siljusson av Terna: Os-Anders
Sivert Eliassen. Sivert
Ernst Vaumund: Aksel Strøm
Rolf Christensen
Sigurd Køvatn
Sesse Schanke

References

1921 films
Norwegian silent feature films
Films based on works by Knut Hamsun
Norwegian black-and-white films
Norwegian drama films
1921 drama films
Silent drama films